Rogers Bernard Alexander (born August 11, 1964) is a former American football linebacker in the National Football League (NFL) who played for the New York Jets and New England Patriots. He played college football at Penn State University.

References 

1964 births
Living people
Players of American football from Washington, D.C.
American football linebackers
Penn State Nittany Lions football players
New York Jets players
New England Patriots players